Speed skating at the 1972 Winter Olympics, was held from 4 to 12 February. Eight events were contested at Makomanai Open Stadium in Sapporo, Japan. This was the first Olympics at which electronic times were recorded to the hundredth of a second.

Medal summary

Medal table

The Netherlands topped the medal table, with four golds and nine overall, led by Ard Schenk's three gold medals.

Schenk led the individual medal table, winning each of the three longer distance events. The most successful female skater was the Netherlands's Stien Kaiser, who won one gold and one silver medal.

Men's events

Women's events

Records

Seven of the eight events had new Olympic records set, with only the men's 5000 metres record remaining unbroken.

Participating NOCs

Eighteen nations competed in the speed skating events at Sapporo.

References

 
1972 Winter Olympics events
1972
1972 in speed skating
Olympics, 1972